An intangible asset is an asset that lacks physical substance. Examples are patents, copyright, franchises, goodwill, trademarks, and trade names, as well as software. This is in contrast to physical assets (machinery, buildings, etc.) and financial assets (government securities, etc.). An intangible asset is usually very difficult to valuate. They suffer from typical market failures of non-rivalry and non-excludability. Today, a large part of the corporate economy (NPV) consists of intangible assets.

Definition
Intangible assets may be one possible contributor to the disparity between "company value as per their accounting records", as well as "company value as per their market capitalization". Considering this argument, it is important to understand what an intangible asset truly is in the eyes of an accountant. A number of attempts have been made to define intangible assets:

 The Australian Accounting Standards Board included examples of intangible items in its definition of assets in Statement of Accounting Concepts number 4 (SAC 4), issued in 1995. The statement did not provide a formal definition of an intangible asset, but did explain that tangibility was not an essential characteristic of an asset.
 The International Accounting Standards Board standard 38 (IAS 38) defines an intangible asset as: "an identifiable non-monetary asset without physical substance". This definition is in addition to the standard definition of an asset which requires a past event that has given rise to a resource that the entity controls and from which future economic benefits are expected to flow. Thus, the extra requirement for an intangible asset under IAS 38 is identifiability. This criterion requires that an intangible asset is separable from the entity or that it arises from a contractual or legal right.
 The Financial Accounting Standards Board Accounting Standard Codification 350 (ASC 350) defines an intangible asset as an asset, other than a financial asset, that lacks physical substance.

The lack of physical substance would therefore seem to be a defining characteristic of an intangible asset. Both the IASB and FASB definitions specifically preclude monetary assets in their definition of an intangible asset. This is necessary in order to avoid the classification of items such as accounts receivable, derivatives and cash in the bank as an intangible asset. IAS 38 contains examples of intangible assets, including: computer software, copyright and patents.

Research and development 
Research and development (known also as R&D) is considered to be an intangible asset (about 16 percent of all intangible assets in the US), even though most countries treat R&D as current expenses for both legal and tax purposes. Most countries report some intangibles in their National Income and Product Accounts (NIPA), yet no country has included a comprehensive measure of 93180859 assets. The contribution of intangible assets in long-term GDP growth has been recognized by economists. Also of note, acquired "In-Process Research and Development" (IPR&D) is considered an asset under US GAAP.

IAS 38 requires any project that results in the generation of a resource to the entity be classified into two phases: a research phase, and a development phase.

The classification of research and development expenditure can be highly subjective, and it is important to note that organizations may have ulterior motives in their classification of research and development expenditures. Less scrupulous directors may manipulate financial statements through misclassification of research and development expenditures.

Financial accounting

General standards 

The International Accounting Standards Board (IASB) offers some guidance (IAS 38) as to how intangible assets should be accounted for in financial statements. In general, legal intangibles that are developed internally are not recognized and legal intangibles that are purchased from third parties are recognized. Wordings are similar to IAS 9.

Under US GAAP, intangible assets are classified into: Purchased vs. internally created intangibles, and Limited-life vs. indefinite-life intangibles.

Expense allocation 

Intangible assets are typically expensed according to their respective life expectancy. Intangible assets have either an identifiable or an indefinite useful life. Intangible assets with identifiable useful lives are amortized on a straight-line basis over their economic or legal life, whichever is shorter. Examples of intangible assets with identifiable useful lives are copyrights and patents. Intangible assets with indefinite useful lives are reassessed each year for impairment. If an impairment has occurred, then a loss must be recognized. An impairment loss is determined by subtracting the asset's fair value from the asset's book/carrying value. Trademarks and goodwill are examples of intangible assets with indefinite useful lives. Goodwill has to be tested for impairment rather than amortized. If impaired, goodwill is reduced and loss is recognized in the Income statement.

Taxation 

For personal income tax purposes, some costs with respect to intangible assets must be capitalized rather than treated as deductible expenses. Treasury regulations in the USA generally require capitalization of costs associated with acquiring, creating, or enhancing intangible assets. For example, an amount paid to obtain a trademark must be capitalized. Certain amounts paid to facilitate these transactions are also capitalized. Some types of intangible assets are categorized based on whether the asset is acquired from another party or created by the taxpayer. The regulations contain many provisions intended to make it easier to determine when capitalization is required.

Given the growing importance of intangible assets as a source of economic growth and tax revenue, and because their non-physical nature makes it easier for taxpayers to engage in tax strategies such as income-shifting or transfer pricing, tax authorities and international organizations have been designing ways to link intangible assets to the place where they were created, hence defining nexus. Intangibles for corporations are amortized over a 15-year period, equivalent to 180 months.

Definition of "intangibles" differs from standard accounting, in some US state governments. These governments may refer to stocks and bonds as "intangibles".

See also 
 Cognitive assets
 Intellectual capital
 Intellectual property
 Brand
 Copyright
 Patent
 Patent valuation
 Trademark
 Trade secret
 Goodwill (accounting)
 Real assets
 Tangible common equity
 Tangible property
 Intangible asset finance

References

External links

National intangible capital NIC 2016 database / Findings and results for economic impacts of national intangible capital 2001 - 2016

Asset